Álvaro Mejía Castrillón (born January 19, 1967 in Santa Rosa de Cabal, Risaralda Department) is a Colombian former professional road cyclist.

Mejía took up cycling at the age of 16, after watching Lucho Herrera, Fabio Parra and Óscar Vargas racing in the Vuelta a Colombia. He had previously competed in football and athletics, having been national junior champion for the 10,000 metres. In 1988 he won the Under-23 Vuelta a Colombia and the Clásico RCN. He won the young rider classification in the 1991 Tour de France and finished fourth at the 1991 UCI Road World Championships in Stuttgart, where he was part of the winning break alongside Gianni Bugno, Steven Rooks and Miguel Indurain. Mejía joined the Motorola team in 1993: that season he won the Volta a Catalunya and finished fourth in the 1993 Tour de France. Subsequently he spent two more seasons with Motorola before finishing his road racing career with the Petroleo de Colombia team. He spent two more years racing mountain bikes before retiring from competition. During his career he also won other stage races including the Vuelta a Murcia, Route du Sud and Vuelta a Galicia.

After retiring from competition, Mejía became a doctor and lecturer, and has taught at the Technological University of Pereira and the Universidad Andina in Pereira.

Career achievements

Major results

1987
 3rd Overall Clásico RCN
1st Stage 7
1988
 1st  Overall Clásico RCN
 2nd Overall Vuelta a Colombia
1st Prologue & Stage 6
1989
 1st  Overall Clásico RCN
1st Stages 6 & 8 (ITT)
 3rd Trofeo Masferrer
1990
 2nd Overall Clásico RCN
 3rd Overall Critérium du Dauphiné Libéré
1st Stage 8 (ITT)
1991
 1st  Young rider classification Tour de France
 1st  Overall Tour of Galicia
1st Stage 3
 4th Road race, UCI Road World Championships
 4th Overall Volta a Catalunya
1992
 1st  Overall Vuelta a Murcia
 4th Overall Clásico RCN
1st Prologue
1993
 1st  Overall Volta a Catalunya
 3rd Overall Tour of Galicia
 4th Overall Tour de France
1994
 1st  Overall Route du Sud
 6th Overall Vuelta a Murcia
1995
 4th Overall Tour DuPont
 8th Overall Critérium du Dauphiné Libéré

Grand Tour general classification results timeline

References

External links
Article on Mejía from diariovasco.com 

1967 births
Living people
People from Santa Rosa de Cabal
Colombian male cyclists
Colombian physicians